Vojvoda Šako Petrović-Njegoš (Serbian Cyrillic: Шако Петровић-Његош, 1854-1914), was a Montenegrin theologian, military commander, politician and 
cousin of Montenegrin King Nikola I.

Biography
Šako Petrović-Njegoš was the first president of the National Assembly in the Principality of Montenegro (from November 1906 until 9 July 1907), a state advisor and the founder of the People's Party in 1906, a party that a few years later played a key role in the dethroning of the Petrović-Njegoš dynasty. People's Party was the first political party in Montenegro.

References

1854 births
1914 deaths
Military personnel from Cetinje
People of the Principality of Montenegro
Petrović-Njegoš dynasty
Speakers of the Parliament of Montenegro
Politicians from Cetinje